The 2012 Wimbledon Championships was a tennis tournament played on grass courts at the All England Lawn Tennis and Croquet Club in Wimbledon, London in the United Kingdom. It was the 126th edition of the Wimbledon Championships and were held from 25 June to 8 July 2012. It was the third Grand Slam tennis event of the year and was part of the ATP World Tour, the WTA Tour, the ITF Junior Tour and the NEC Tour. The championships were organised by the All England Lawn Tennis and Croquet Club and the International Tennis Federation.

Both Novak Djokovic and Petra Kvitová were unsuccessful in their 2011 title defences, both being defeated by the eventual champions: Djokovic was defeated by Roger Federer in the semifinals, and Kvitová lost to Serena Williams in the quarterfinals. In four sets, Federer defeated Andy Murray to win a record-equalling seven Wimbledon titles, while Murray became the first British male player to reach a Wimbledon singles final in the Open era. Williams defeated first-time Wimbledon finalist Agnieszka Radwańska in three sets to equal her sister Venus in winning five Wimbledon titles. Both Federer and Williams were more than 30 years old at the time of their victories. With the victories, Federer reclaimed the World No. 1 ranking for the first time since June 2010, thus allowing him to equal, then to break, the all-time record of most weeks ranked at World No. 1 held by Pete Sampras. Agnieszka Radwańska, Victoria Azarenka, and Maria Sharapova were in contention for the world number 1 ranking. Since Sharapova lost in the fourth round and Radwańska was a match away from becoming the world number 1 but lost it, Azarenka continued her success as the number 1.

Events
On 28 June, World No. 100 Lukáš Rosol upset World No. 2 and two-time Wimbledon champion Rafael Nadal in five sets.
On 30 June:
Marin Čilić beat Sam Querrey, 7–6(8–6), 6–4, 6–7(2–7), 6–7(3–7), 17–15. At 5 hours and 31 minutes, it was then the second longest match in Wimbledon history. This would later be surpassed by the 2018 semifinal match between Kevin Anderson and John Isner.
Yaroslava Shvedova became the first player in a Grand Slam tournament to win a golden set, beating 2012 French Open finalist Sara Errani, 6–0, 6–4.
Andy Murray and Marcos Baghdatis finished play at 23:02, the latest-ever finish to a match at Wimbledon.
On 5 July, Agnieszka Radwańska became the first Pole, male or female, to reach a Grand Slam singles final in the Open era.
On 6 July, Murray became the first British man in 74 years to reach the singles final, defeating Jo-Wilfried Tsonga in the semifinal.
On 7 July:
Serena Williams won her fifth Wimbledon title, tying her sister Venus in doing so.
Jonathan Marray and Frederik Nielsen became the first wild card to win the gentlemen's doubles title, beating both of the previous year's finalists along the way. Marray also became the first British player to win the men's doubles title in the Open era.
On 8 July, Roger Federer achieved a record-tying seventh singles title at Wimbledon, tied with Pete Sampras (Open Era) and William Renshaw (Amateur Era).

Point and prize money distribution

Point distribution
Below are the tables with the point distribution for each discipline of the tournament.

Senior points

Wheelchair points

Junior points

Prize money
For 2012, the prize money purse was increased to £16,060,000 from £14,600,000 in 2011. The winner of the men's and women's singles title earned £1,150,000.

* per team

Singles players
Men's singles

Women's singles

Day-by-day summaries

Champions

Seniors

Men's singles

 Roger Federer def.  Andy Murray, 4–6, 7–5, 6–3, 6–4
 It was Federer's 5th title of the year and 1st Grand Slam title of the year. It was his 7th Wimbledon title, 17th Grand Slam title, and 75th career title.

Women's singles

 Serena Williams def.  Agnieszka Radwańska, 6–1, 5–7, 6–2
 It was Williams' 3rd title of the year and 1st Grand Slam title of the year. It was her 5th Wimbledon title, 14th Grand Slam title, and 42nd career title.

Men's doubles

 Jonathan Marray /  Frederik Nielsen def.  Robert Lindstedt /  Horia Tecău, 4–6, 6–4, 7–6(7–5), 6–7(5–7), 6–3

Women's doubles

 Serena Williams /  Venus Williams def.  Andrea Hlaváčková /  Lucie Hradecká, 7–5, 6–4
This was the Williams sisters' 13th Grand Slam title.

Mixed doubles

 Mike Bryan /  Lisa Raymond def.  Leander Paes /  Elena Vesnina, 6–3, 5–7, 6–4

Juniors

Boys' singles

 Filip Peliwo def.   Luke Saville, 7–5, 6–4

Girls' singles

 Eugenie Bouchard def.  Elina Svitolina, 6–2, 6–2

Boys' doubles

 Andrew Harris /  Nick Kyrgios def.  Matteo Donati /  Pietro Licciardi, 6–2, 6–4

Girls' doubles

 Eugenie Bouchard /   Taylor Townsend def.  Belinda Bencic /  Ana Konjuh, 6–4, 6–3

Invitation

Gentlemen's invitation doubles

 Greg Rusedski /  Fabrice Santoro def.  Thomas Enqvist /  Mark Philippoussis, 6–7(3–7), 6–4, [11–9]

Ladies' invitation doubles

 Lindsay Davenport /  Martina Hingis def.  Martina Navratilova /  Jana Novotná, 6–3, 6–2

Senior gentlemen's invitation doubles

 Pat Cash /  Mark Woodforde def.  Jeremy Bates /  Anders Järryd, 6–3, 6–4

Wheelchair

Wheelchair men's doubles

 Tom Egberink /  Michaël Jérémiasz def.  Robin Ammerlaan /  Ronald Vink, 6–4, 6–2

Wheelchair women's doubles

 Jiske Griffioen /  Aniek van Koot def.  Lucy Shuker /  Jordanne Whiley, 6–1, 6–2

Singles seeds
The following are the seeded players and notable players who withdrew from the event. Seedings based on ATP and WTA rankings are as of 18 June 2012, Rankings and Points are as of 25 June 2012.

Men's singles
Because the tournament takes place one week later than in 2011, points defending includes results from both the 2011 Wimbledon and tournaments from the week of 4 July 2011 (Newport and Davis Cup).

The Men's singles seeds is arranged on a surface-based system to reflect more accurately the individual player's grass court achievement as per the following formula:
ATP Entry System Position points as at a week before The Championships
Add 100% points earned for all grass court tournaments in the past 12 months
add 75% points earned for best grass court tournament in the 12 months before that.

The following player would have been seeded, but he withdrew from the event.

Women's singles
Because the tournament takes place one week later than in 2011, points defending includes results from both the 2011 Wimbledon and tournaments from the week of 4 July 2011 (Budapest and Båstad).

For the Women's singles seeds, the seeding order follows the ranking list, except where in the opinion of the committee, the grass court credentials of a particular player necessitates a change in the interest of achieving a balanced draw.

The following players would have been seeded, but they withdrew from the event.

Main draw wild card entries
The following players received wild cards into the main draw senior events.

Men's singles
  Jamie Baker
  David Goffin
  Oliver Golding
  Josh Goodall
  Tommy Haas
  Lleyton Hewitt
  James Ward
  Grega Žemlja

Women's singles
  Ashleigh Barty
  Naomi Broady
  Johanna Konta
  Melanie Oudin
  Virginie Razzano
  Laura Robson
  Yaroslava Shvedova

Men's doubles
  Liam Broady /  Oliver Golding
  Jamie Delgado /  Ken Skupski
  Chris Guccione /  Lleyton Hewitt
  Josh Goodall /  James Ward
  Jonathan Marray /  Frederik Nielsen

Women's doubles
  Naomi Broady /  Johanna Konta
  Tara Moore /  Melanie South
  Laura Robson /  Heather Watson

Mixed doubles
  Ross Hutchins /  Heather Watson
  Dominic Inglot /  Laura Robson
  Jonathan Marray /  Anne Keothavong
  Ken Skupski /  Melanie South

Qualifiers entries
Below are the lists of the qualifiers entering in the main draws.

Men's singles

Men's singles qualifiers''
  Jürgen Zopp
  Adrián Menéndez Maceiras
  Guillaume Rufin
  Michael Russell
  Jesse Levine
  Florent Serra
  Ryan Sweeting
  Dustin Brown
  Simone Bolelli
  Jimmy Wang
  Brian Baker
  Kenny de Schepper
  Ruben Bemelmans
  Íñigo Cervantes
  Jerzy Janowicz
  Andrey KuznetsovLucky losers  Wayne Odesnik

Women's singlesWomen's singles qualifiers  Melinda Czink
  Annika Beck
  Maria Elena Camerin
  Kristina Mladenovic
  Sandra Zaniewska
  Vesna Dolonc
  Jana Čepelová
  Kristýna Plíšková
  Karolína Plíšková
  Camila Giorgi
  CoCo Vandeweghe
  Mirjana LučićLucky losers  Misaki Doi

Men's doublesMen's doubles qualifiers  Andre Begemann /  Igor Zelenay
  Matthias Bachinger /  Tobias Kamke
  Bobby Reynolds /  Izak van der Merwe
  Lewis Burton /  George MorganLucky losers  Sanchai Ratiwatana /  Sonchat Ratiwatana
  Colin Ebelthite /  John Peers

Women's doublesWomen's doubles qualifiers'''
  Darija Jurak /  Katalin Marosi
  Mirjana Lučić /  Valeria Savinykh
  Lindsay Lee-Waters /  Megan Moulton-Levy
  Vesna Dolonc /  Olga Savchuk

Protected ranking
The following players were accepted directly into the main draw using a protected ranking:
 Men's singles
  Benjamin Becker
  Paul-Henri Mathieu

Withdrawals
The following players were accepted directly into the main tournament, but withdrew with injuries or personal reasons.

Men's singles
 Pablo Cuevas → replaced by  Vasek Pospisil
 Somdev Devvarman → replaced by  Karol Beck
 Gaël Monfils → replaced by  Wayne Odesnik
 Robin Söderling → replaced by  Blaž Kavčič

Women's singles
 Alexandra Dulgheru → replaced by  Nina Bratchikova
 Kaia Kanepi → replaced by  Heather Watson
 Michaëlla Krajicek → replaced by  Misaki Doi
 Andrea Petkovic → replaced by  Bojana Jovanovski
 Ágnes Szávay → replaced by  Lesia Tsurenko

References

External links

 Official Wimbledon Championships website

 
Wimbledon Championships
Wimbledon Championships
Wimbledon Championships
Wimbledon Championships